Tell es-Sakan, lit. "Hill of Ash", is a now almost entirely destroyed tell (archaeological mound) standing some 5 km south of Gaza City in what is today the Gaza Strip, on the northern bank of Wadi Ghazzeh. It was the site of two separate Early Bronze Age urban settlements: an earlier one representing the fortified administrative center of the Egyptian colonies in southwestern Palestine from the end of the 4th millennium, and a later, local Canaanite fortified city of the third millennium. The location at the mouth of what was probably a palaeochannel of the river, allowed it to develop as an important maritime settlement with a natural harbour. Its geographical location endowed it with a position of importance at the crossroads of land-based trade routes between the Canaan region, the Old Kingdom of Egypt, and Arabia. As of 2000, the early Egyptian settlement was the oldest fortified site known to researchers in both Egypt and Palestine.

Topography, discovery, research
Tell es-Sakan, which in the Bronze Age apparently possessed a harbour on Wadi Ghazzeh's now silted-up estuary, today stands at a remarkable distance north of the stream's current course, which has changed over time. When it was rediscovered, the artificial mound rose over 10 m above the Coastal Plain and was completely covered by a sand dune. All previous surveys failed to detect the tell, and it was only discovered by chance in 1998 during the construction of a new housing complex; construction work was temporarily suspended to allow an archaeological investigation to be conducted. A brief survey in 1999 was followed the next year by a large-scale excavation campaign involving three different areas covering a total area of c. 1,400 m². The excavations were suspended in 2002 for security reasons and were never restarted until the final destruction of the  tell in 2017.

History
The accidental exposure brought to light the only settlement of the Early Bronze Age discovered to date in the Gaza Strip, with exceptionally well-preserved remains of mud-brick constructions and a wealth of other findings dating exclusively to that period. Tell es-Sakan, while still in southwestern Canaan, was located on its border and near a ford on the coastal road leading to Egypt, an ideal place for archaeologists to study the interaction between Egypt and Palestine during the time the tell was occupied, the fourth and third millennia BCE.

The site was inhabited between 3300 and 2400/2350 BCE, and covered over 5 hectares. It appears to be the predecessor to the Tell al-Ajjul settlement, a major city of the second millennium BCE located just 500 metres further south.

Excavations revealed that the site was occupied during two distinct major phases: the lower levels of excavation area A belong to a city of the Egyptian Protodynastic Period, which corresponds to the Early Bronze Age IB period in the history of the Southern Levant (the end of the 4th millennium BCE); and the middle and upper levels of Areas B and C belong to a Canaanite settlement dating to the third millennium.

The importance of the discoveries was such, that they helped to completely reinterpret the relations between the Egyptians and the Levant during the 4th and 3rd millennia BCE.

Egyptian city (Early Bronze Age IB)
The Bronze Age port dates to the end of the 4th millennium BCE, and was contemporary with En Besor, an Egyptian First Dynasty staging post along the "Ways of Horus" trade route in the Northern Negev. En Besor was much smaller, but it was an important source for fresh water to supply the caravans. There were also some other smaller Egyptian settlements in this area.

The architectural remains, as well as almost all of the findings from Area A, are typical of the Nile Valley around 3200-3000 BCE.

The only other Egyptian settlement in this area that was older than es-Sakan was Taur Ikhbeineh. The occupation there started in 3500 BC and ended in 3200 BC, while es-Sakan was still flourishing. Taur Ikhbeineh is located nearby, and it was active from the period Naqada IIb-c, and until the period Naqada IIIa, according to the Egyptian chronology.

At Tell es-Sakan, truly exceptional was the discovery of the fortifications, represented by two successively built, powerful mud brick walls. This was interpreted as proof for the importance of the settlement, which may have been the administrative centre of the colonial domain established by the Egyptians in southwestern Palestine during the Early Dynastic Period. A remarkable fact is that Tell es-Sakan was at the time of its excavation the oldest fortified site known in both Egypt and Palestine.

Other finds of Egyptian or "Egyptianising" pottery from this early period have also been found at the sites of Tel Erani, Arad, Tell el-Khuweilifeh/Tel Halif, and Tel Lod. Nevertheless, the quantity of such pottery is rather small compared to the amount of the Levantine Early Bronze Age pottery at these sites.

This phase of the occupation of the site lasted until about 3000 BC (the very end of EBI and the beginning of EBII).

There are indications that this part of the occupation at the site ended at the beginning of the First Dynasty of Egypt, perhaps under the reign of one of the successors of Narmer, such as Hor-Aha or Den.

Canaanite city (Early Bronze Age III)
The Egyptian colonial domain in the region eventually disappeared and the site was abandoned for several centuries.

In the Early Bronze Age III (EBIII, c. 2650-2300) was the site reoccupied, when the local population created a new, fortified city. Five levels of occupation have been found lasting about 300 years. There are indications that the reoccupation of the site took place at the beginning of the Egyptian Fourth Dynasty.

A strong mud brick rampart consisting of a wall strengthened by a glacis surrounded an urban settlement described by researchers as having strong local particularities, while also showing close links with Palestinian sites located further inland. The walls at that time were 8 metres thick and built of sun-dried mud bricks.

This Canaanite settlement is dated solely to the Early Bronze period, when the major sites of southwestern Canaan reached their greatest prosperity. Then the settlement was finally abandoned around 2400-2350 BCE.

Settlement economy 
The lifestyles and economic activity at the site changed over the centuries. While hunting was widely practised early on, later, agriculture and animal husbandry became predominant.

Remains of sheep, goat and cattle were discovered, as well as fish bones and shells. Wheat, barley, vegetables, olives, and grapes were cultivated.

Later nearby cities (MB-LB)
Along with all other urban sites in Palestine, Tell es-Sakan was abandoned during what is known as the Intermediate Bronze Age, and in this concrete case also during part of the following Middle Bronze Age, with the region returning for several centuries to nomadic pastoralism. This nomadic population only settled down again around 1800 BCE, by then though choosing a site 500 metres to the south, known in Arabic as Tell el-Ajjul. The new city reached a great degree of prosperity in the second millennium. Tell el-Ajjul and another nearby site, al-Mughraqa, saw occupation during the Middle and Late Bronze Age.

Another site further south, at Deir al-Balah, was occupied during the 14th–12th centuries BCE, the time of the Egyptian New Kingdom (Late Bronze Age).

Destruction 2017
In 2017 Hamas authorities levelled the site with bulldozers to make way for military bases and construction projects, despite local protests by Gazans protesting destruction of ancient Palestinian archaeological heritage.

Footnotes

Bibliography
 2001 Miroschedji, P. de, et M. Sadek, — « Gaza et l’Égypte de l’époque prédynastique à l’Ancien Empire : Premiers résultats des fouilles de Tell es-Sakan. » Bulletin de la  152 : 28-52.
 2001 Miroschedji, P. de, et M. Sadek; Faltings, D.; Boulez, V.; Naggiar, L.; Sykes, N. Tengberg, M. — « Les fouilles de Tell es-Sakan (Gaza) : nouvelles données sur les contacts égypto-cananéens aux IVe-IIIe millénaires. » Paléorient 27/2 : 75-104.
 2012 Miroschedji, P. de, — Egypt and Southern Canaan in the Third Millennium BCE : Uni’s Asiatic Campaigns Revisited. pp. 265–292 dans : Mayer Gruber, Shmuel Ahituv, Gunnar Lehmann, and Zipora Talshir, eds., All the Wisdom of the East, Studies in Near Eastern Archaeology and History in Honor of Eliezer D. Oren. Orbis biblicus et orientalis 255. Fribourg : Academic Press, et Göttingen : Vandenhoeck & Ruprecht.
 2015 Miroschedji, P. de, –– “Les relations entre l’Égypte et le Levant aux IVe et IIIe millénaires à la lumière des fouilles de Tell es-Sakan.” Comptes rendus de l’Académie des Inscriptions et Belles-Lettres 2015 (avril-juin) : 1003–1038.

Populated places established in the 4th millennium BC
Populated places disestablished in the 3rd millennium BC
1998 archaeological discoveries
2017 disestablishments in the State of Palestine
Buildings and structures demolished in 2017
Archaeological discoveries in the State of Palestine
History of Palestine (region)
Archaeological sites in the Gaza Strip
Archaeology of the Near East
Bronze Age sites in the State of Palestine
Cities in ancient Egypt